The Republic of China government recognized the formation of the Provisional Government of the Republic of Korea on April 13, 1919, as one of the participants of the Cairo Conference, which resulted in the Cairo Declaration. One of the main purposes of the Cairo Declaration was to create an independent Korea, free from Japanese colonial rule. Bilateral diplomatic relations between the Government of the Republic of Korea and the Republic of China began in 1948, just after the foundation of the First Republic, hence making China, the first country to recognize the Republic of Korea as the sole legitimate government of Korea. After the Chinese Civil War in 1949, the Republic of Korea maintained relations with the Republic of China (Taiwan), which the island of Taiwan was also formerly under Japanese rule.

Diplomatic relations between South Korea and the Republic of China (Taiwan) were terminated on 23 August 1992, followed by South Korean recognition of the People's Republic of China (PRC, Communist China) and formation of bilateral recognition between them. But just shortly after,   ROC-ROK relations resumed in 1993 under the "New Relations Framework Agreement". Taipei City is Seoul City's first Sister City. Both countries have strong non-diplomatic relations. South Korea sent military personnel in the Political Warfare training in Fu Hsing Kang College.

Independence of the Republic of Korea and the Korean War
The division of Korea, which ended 35 years of Japanese control, was followed by a period of trusteeship by American occupation in the south. The first General Election of 1948 South Korean Constitutional Assembly election founded the First Republic under the supervision of United Nations. The Republic of China recognized the Constitutional Korean government in the southern portion of the Korean Peninsula and opened an Embassy in Myeongdong, Seoul, on 4 January 1949, four months after the establishment of the Republic of Korea.

The People's Republic of China (PRC) was founded in 1949 following the Chinese Civil War and Republic of Korea maintained relations with the Republic of China (ROC), whose government relocated to Taiwan, formerly a Qing prefecture that was under 50 years of Japanese colonial occupation from 1895 to 1945.

The United Nations condemned North Korea's military aggression against Republic of Korea in United Nations Security Council Resolution 82 and United Nations Security Council Resolution 84.  The ROC voted in favor of both United Nations resolutions. During the Korean War, the ROC supplied material aid to ROK, while the People's Republic of China gave North Korea combatants to support the People's Volunteer Army.

Cold War diplomacy

Both the ROK and ROC governments opposed socialism, as well as the Democratic People's Republic of Korea (DPRK) and People's Republic of China (PRC). Neither ROK nor ROC recognized or formed a diplomatic relationship with the DPRK and PRC governments. The Republic of Korea referred to the PRC as 'Communist China' (중공, 中共), and the ROC as 'Nationalist China' (국부중국, 國府中國; before 1960s) or 'Free China' (자유중국, 自由中國; after 1970s). The government of the ROC also considered the Republic of Korea government as the sole legitimate state in the Korean peninsula.

President Park Chung-hee visited Taipei on a state visit in February 1966, in which he expressed solidarity with the ROC and South Vietnam, declaring that: 'We are not breakwaters which passively protect the port from onrushing waves. We are not standing still only to be gradually eroded by the waves of Communism.'

Termination of diplomatic relations
The Sixth Republic of South Korea furthered the Miracle on the Han River to the Economy of South Korea and opened diplomacy to Communist Nations (including building the foundation of Inter-Korean relations and accepting co-existence with North Korea by entering the United Nations ). Seoul also hosted the 1988 Summer Olympics.  President Roh Tae-woo's next political ambition was to begin implementing Realpolitik with the neighboring countries in Northeast Asia.
South Korea's movement away from anti-communist foreign policy to improve relations with nearby communist countries resulted in a deterioration of relations with ROC. This change was introduced to appease North Korea and ease the political anxiety and softens military tension in the Korean Peninsula; Korea hoped to enable the possibility of a peaceful reunification in the Korean peninsula. As normalization began, ROK transferred diplomatic recognition from ROC to the PRC, and confiscated the property of the ROC embassy, transferring it to the PRC. Taiwan is a member of Property Rights Alliance. On 17 September 1991, the PRC withdrew its objection to South Korean membership in the United Nations. South Korea was the last Asian country with formal diplomatic relations with ROC.

Economy
The annual trade volume between South Korea and Taiwan is around US$30 billion, with semiconductor products have been the largest item in the trade over the past few years. As of April 2016, the total amount of mutual investments between the two sides reached around US$2.4 billion in areas such as communication, consumer products, finance, information technology, iron, medicine, metal, securities and semiconductor.

Flights between South Korea and Taiwan

After Seoul's recognition of the PRC government in Beijing, direct commercial flights between Seoul and Taipei operated by Korean and Taiwanese airlines were terminated. Cathay Pacific and Thai Airways International however, operated the route as a Fifth Freedom sector. The reduction of scheduled flights caused tourist numbers from Taiwan to drop from 420,000 in 1992 to 200,000 in 1993, recovering only partially to 360,000 by 2003.

On September 1, 2004, representatives of the two countries' unofficial missions, the "Korean Mission in Taipei" and the "Taipei Mission in Seoul" signed an aviation agreement allowing aircraft of each side to enter the airspace of the other. This permitted the resumption of direct scheduled flights by Korean and Taiwanese airlines and also allowed flights from Republic of Korea to Southeast Asia to fly over the island of Taiwan instead of detouring over mainland China or the Philippines. Analysts estimated this would save Republic of Korean airline companies ₩33 billion (US$29 million at 2004 exchange rates) in fuel costs and other fees.

Kim Young-sam's visits to Taiwan

Former President of South Korea Kim Young-sam visited Taipei for five days in July 2001. During this visit, he met President of ROC (Taiwan) Chen Shui-bian at a lunch banquet, but the two were unable to come to an agreement over the wording of a joint written statement urging the resumption of direct air travel.

In October 2004, following the aviation agreement, Kim came to Taiwan once more at Chen's invitation. He delivered a speech at National Chengchi University and toured port facilities in Kaohsiung, the sister city of Republic of Korea's Busan.

Taiwan admission into APEC and participation in OECD
The ROK government acted as the interlocutor and supported Taipei's admission into Asia-Pacific Economic Cooperation (APEC) in 1991. Republic of Korea altered the nature of political acronym of Member States to Member Economies in APEC to make APEC formally a Trans-Pacific Economic Forum. Personnel of Taipei's Ministry of Foreign Affairs are forbidden to participate in the APEC, but the Minister of Economic Affairs of Republic of China, a special envoy appointed by the President of Republic of China and business representatives from Republic of China that publicly, can attend annual APEC Meetings under the name of Chinese Taipei. Taipei can also host non-ministerial APEC consortiums and workshops concerning topics in which Taiwan has specific strengths, such as technology and small and medium enterprise. These consortia and workshops are intended to address only success on economics and business-related issues with other APEC Member Economies. Taiwan's participation in APEC is supported by the United States and accepted by People's Republic of China. The APEC Business Travel Card (ATBC) scheme applies to business travelers to and from Taiwan. South Korea also supported Taiwan's initial participation in OECD and subsequent activities.

Re-establishing non-official relations

The Republic of Korea re-established non-official relations with the Republic of China in 1993, interchangeably and reciprocally as Korean Mission in Taipei and Taipei Mission in Korea. Taipei Mission in Korea, Busan Office is located in the southern region of ROK. Since 1993, there is a significant trade volume between the two nations. Two countries have mutually extended to 90 days of stay with the exemption of visa for visitors from July 1, 2012. The 19th Seoul-Taipei forum was held on October 13, 2010.

In 2022 South Korea and Taiwan signed an agreement to recognize each other's drivers licenses.

Education
There is a rigorous scholarly exchange and there are multiple ROC Chinese international schools in Republic of Korea:

 Seoul Chinese Primary School 
 Seoul Overseas Chinese High School
 Yeongdeugpou Korea Chinese Primary School
 Overseas Chinese Elementary School Busan
 Overseas Chinese Middle and High School Busan
 Overseas Chinese Elementary School Daegu
 Overseas Chinese Middle and High School Daegu
 Overseas Chinese School Incheon
 Suwon Zhongzheng Chinese Elementary School
 Overseas Chinese Elementary School Uijongbu 
 Wonju Chinese Elementary School 
 Chungju Chinese Elementary School 
 Onyang Chinese Elementary School 
 Kunsan Chinese Elementary School

There are two South Korean international schools in the ROC:

 Taipei Korean Elementary School (타이페이한국학교)
 Kaohsiung Korea School (가오슝한국국제학교)

See also
 China–North Korea relations
 China–South Korea relations
 North Korea–Taiwan relations
 Taipei Mission in Korea
 Japanese colonial empire

Further reading
 Giovannettone, J. “Chain Reactions: Linking the Conflicts on the Korean Peninsula and Taiwan Strait,” American Diplomacy (November 2006): 1-19.
 Hu, S. “The Korean Factor in Cross-Taiwan Strait Relations,” in Baogang Guo and Chung-chian Teng, ed., China's Quiet Rise: Peace through Integration (New York: Lexington Books, 2011): 103–123.

References

 

 
1949 establishments in South Korea
1949 establishments in Taiwan
Bilateral relations of Taiwan
Taiwan